Ekpe is a secret society in Nigeria and Cameroon.

Ekpe may also refer to:

 Ekpè, Benin
 Ekpe (given name), several people
 Ekpe (surname), several people